Man's Best Friend (known as  aka the Inu mo Arukeba series) is an explicit yaoi manga from the creator of Wild Rock, Kazusa Takashima, and is published in English by Blu Manga, which is a now defunct boys' love publishing, division of Tokyopop.

Description
When Ukyou rescues a stray dog, naming it Kuro, he soon learns that he may have found a rare breed—his new dog can talk and magically transform into a muscular human. With his dog now taking the form of a attractive man and licking him in various places, what is Ukyou to do?!

Plot summary
The manga is split into three stories:
 The first three chapters are about a dog named Kuro, who magically transforms into a human with dog ears and a tail whenever he gets excited, and his "owner" Ukyo.
 The two next chapters ( and Pinpoint Lovers) are about Kentaro and Kasumi, who reunite after a decade apart. Long ago, Kentaro had made a promise to wait ten years for Kasumi, but at the time he had thought that Kasumi was a girl.
 The last chapter is about a man, Keisuke, who rescues a magical goldfish from a group of children. Said goldfish then transforms into a man, thanking Keisuke.

Trivia
 The character Kuro from the first storyline makes a cameo appearance in Kentaro and Kasumi's storyline.

Publication
For the English release of Man's Best Friend, Blu Manga decided to replace the original cover art, depicting Kuro reclining shirtless in a cowboy hat with a strategically placed gun holster at his crotch. The Japanese inside cover art instead depicts Kuro tearing off Ukyou's shirt with his teeth. The former was the book's second print (2007) cover in Japan and the latter was the first print's (2004) cover in Japan.

Reception
The manga has been described as "reminiscent of Guru Guru Pon-chan." Kuro's dog-like characterization was praised by Sequential Tart.  Library Journal described the stories as contrived and said that the characters "exist to have sex".  Christopher Butcher regarded Man's Best Friend as being the "most unique" of Blu's releases, and as a "very creative" fetish. Dru Pagliassotti, comparing romance novels with Boys Love manga, mentions Man's Best Friend as an example of a kemonomimi "society", or setting.

References

External links
 
 Man's Best Friend page on Blu Manga

Manga anthologies
2004 manga
Tokyopop titles
Yaoi anime and manga